Edward Pohau Ellison  (26 November 1884 – 9 November 1963), generally known as Ned Ellison and also as Pohau Erihana, was a New Zealand rugby player, doctor, and public health administrator.

Biography
Ellison was born in Waikanae, New Zealand, on 26 November 1884. Of Māori descent, he identified with the Ngai Tahu and Te Ati Awa iwi.

Ellison attended Te Aute College and qualified as a physician at the University of Otago. In 1919 he was appointed Medical Officer and Deputy Resident Commissioner in Niue, later earning promotion to the post of Resident Commissioner. He subsequently moved to the Chatham Islands as Medical Officer and Resident Magistrate, before becoming Chief Medical Officer and Deputy Resident Commissioner of the Cook Islands in 1925. He returned to New Zealand in 1926 to become Director of Maori Hygiene, but returned to the Cook Islands in 1930.

In 1935, Ellison was awarded the King George V Silver Jubilee Medal. He was appointed an Officer of the Order of the British Empire in the 1038 New Year Honours.

Ellison retired in 1946 and returned to New Zealand.

References

1884 births
1963 deaths
New Zealand medical administrators
Ngāi Tahu people
Te Āti Awa people
New Zealand Māori rugby union players
New Zealand Māori public servants
People educated at Te Aute College
University of Otago alumni
New Zealand Officers of the Order of the British Empire
People from Waikanae
New Zealand public health doctors
Ellison family
Sportspeople from the Wellington Region